H. glabra may refer to:
 Herniaria glabra, the smooth rupturewort, a plant species found in North America and Europe
 Heliamphora heterodoxa, a marsh pitcher plant species native to Gran Sabana and the plateau of the Ptari-Tepui in Venezuela

See also